Itch.io (stylized as itch.io) is a website for users to host, sell and download indie games. Launched in March 2013 by Leaf Corcoran, the service hosts over 500,000 games and items (assets, ebooks, music) . Itch.io also allows users to host game jams, events where participants have limited time (usually 1–3 days) to create a game. Game Off and Game Maker's Toolkit Game Jam have been hosted on Itch.io.

Due to the amount of freedom developers have on Itch.io, it is widely regarded as a good way for new video game developers to practice creating games and start making money from their games. Itch.io's game jams are also seen as a way for new video game developers to get publicity and improve their game developing skills.

History
On March 3, 2013, Leaf Corcoran posted a blog entry to the site leafo.net detailing what the future website would be about, with a pay-what-you-want model. In an interview with Rock Paper Shotgun, Corcoran said the original idea was not a store but instead a place to "create a customized game homepage". An early inspiration was Bandcamp, a self-publishing site for musicians, and the name itch.io originates from a spare domain that Corcoran had purchased a couple of years prior.

As of June 2015, the service hosted over 15,000 games and programs.

In December 2015, the service announced the release of an open-source desktop application for installing games and other content, as well as keeping existing games and content updated automatically. It was released with simultaneous support for Microsoft Windows, macOS and Linux.

By February 2017, Itch.io had five million downloads.

In April 2021, Itch.io was made available as an app on the Epic Games Store.

Charity bundles 
In support of the George Floyd protests, Itch.io organized the Bundle for Racial Justice and Equality in June 2020. It initially launched with over 700 games, but increased to over 1,500 as additional developers offered to contribute. In 11 days, the bundle raised US$8.1M for the NAACP Legal Defense and Educational Fund and Community Bail Fund.

In June 2021, Itch.io launched a bundle for Palestinian aid, from which all proceeds would go to the United Nations Relief and Works Agency to assist civilians in the Gaza Strip following the 2021 Israel–Palestine crisis. It included 1,272 items and raised over US$899,778.

In March 2022, Itch.io, partnering with Necrosoft Games along with hundreds of other developers, launched the Bundle for Ukraine; money from this bundle would be donated to the International Medical Corps and Voices of Children to provide assistant to civilians in Ukraine who have been impacted by the Russian invasion. The bundle included 991 works and raised over US$400,000 in 24 hours.

Revenue
Developers can charge money for games and assets released onto the platform. In May 2015, Itch.io paid developers a total of US$51,489. By default, the site takes a 10% cut from each sale, but developers can set what percentage of sales goes towards the site, a model termed "Open Revenue Sharing" by Itch.io. Developers set the minimum price for items (which may be free), and customers can pay above that amount to further support developers.

References

External links
 

Internet properties established in 2013
Mobile software distribution platforms
Online-only retailers of video games
Pay what you want game vendors
Video game websites